The 2013–14 Duleep Trophy was the 53rd season of the Duleep Trophy, a first-class cricket tournament contested by five zonal teams of India: Central Zone, East Zone, North Zone, South Zone and West Zone.

The title was shared by North Zone and South Zone.

Results

Final

References

External links
Series home at CricketArchive

Duleep Trophy seasons
Duleep Trophy
Duleep Trophy